The Ministry of Digital Affairs (Polish: Ministerstwo Cyfryzacji) was a ministry of the Polish government founded in December 2015 and dissolved in October 2020. Split from the Ministry of Administration and Digitization, the Ministry was responsible for matters regarding development in the cyber sphere for Poland. The first Minister of Digital Affairs was Anna Streżyńska. After she was recalled on 9 January 2018, the Ministry was under personal supervision of the Polish Prime Minister Mateusz Morawiecki until 17 April 2018 when Marek Zagórski was appointed the Minister of Digital Affairs. The ministry was made defunct in 2020 following a Council of Ministers decree.

Responsibilities 
The Ministry of Digital Affairs was to develop infrastructure related to broadband, to support the creation of web content in Poland and electronic services. It also promoted digital awareness among Polish citizens.

The Ministry was responsible for thirteen departments.

Departments 
 Minister's Office provided parliamentary, governmental and protocol support for the minister and other members of leadership within the Ministry. The Office was also responsible for co-ordinating international trips and visits and helps to organise European and international events relating to Digital Affairs. It also liaised with other EU institutions and international organisations. The Office also provided analytical and communications to support other departments in the Ministry. It also was responsible for all co-ordination of internet and social media communications with the public.
 Department of Telecommunication was responsible for legal matters relating to telecommunication and the development of networks and services. It was also responsible for the execution and implementation of the Polish National Broadband Plan.
 Department of Informatization
 Department of Information Society
 Department of Cyber Security
 Department of IT Infrastructure
 Department of National Records
 Department of European Funds Coordination
 General Director's Office
 Department of Budget and Finance
 Department of Legal Affairs
 Research Office

Leadership

References

2015 establishments in Poland
Digital Affairs
Poland, Digital Affairs
Poland
Ministries established in 2015